Jan Erik Adolfsen (June 1, 1930 – March 27, 2001) was a Norwegian ice hockey player. He played for the Norwegian national ice hockey team, and  participated at the Winter Olympics in 1952, where the Norwegian team placed 9th.

References

1930 births
2001 deaths
Ice hockey players at the 1952 Winter Olympics
Norwegian ice hockey players
Olympic ice hockey players of Norway
Ice hockey people from Oslo